Mystrocnemis is a genus of longhorn beetles of the subfamily Lamiinae, containing the following species:

 Mystrocnemis allardi Breuning, 1961
 Mystrocnemis analis (Fahraeus, 1872)
 Mystrocnemis apicalis Aurivillius, 1915
 Mystrocnemis atricollis Breuning, 1953
 Mystrocnemis bicolor Aurivillius, 1914
 Mystrocnemis flavoapicalis Breuning, 1950
 Mystrocnemis flavovittata Quedenfeldt, 1882
 Mystrocnemis fossulata Breuning, 1956
 Mystrocnemis stictica Aurivillius, 1914

References

Saperdini